Dean Anthony Stokes (born 23 March 1970) is an English former footballer and manager. A former professional with Port Vale and Rochdale throughout the 1990s, he spent time with numerous non-league clubs, before moving into management with Alsager Town and later Rochdale Town. He helped Port Vale to promotion out of the Second Division in 1993–94 and played in the final of the 1996 Anglo-Italian Cup.

Playing career
Stokes was a quick left-back, who after initially turning down Rochdale played for non-league sides Castleton Gabriels, Armitage 90, Redditch United and Halesowen Town.

He returned to the Football League in January 1993, signing for John Rudge's Port Vale of the Second Division. Halesowen Town eventually received £5,000 in payment, as a result of appearance clauses. His professional debut came on 18 December 1993, at the age of 23, in a 1–1 draw with Burnley at Vale Park. He enjoyed regular football for the rest of the 1993–94 promotion winning season, though did lose his place in April. After undergoing ankle surgery in August 1994, he hardly played in Vale's 1994–95 First Division campaign. He hardly featured in the 1995–96 season either, though did come back into first team plans in March 1996. He played in the 1996 Anglo-Italian Cup Final, as Vale lost 5–2 to Genoa.

One of the most successful seasons in Port Vale's history was 1996–97, Stokes played eleven games, ten of which were in the league. In 1997–98, he again appeared infrequently with just nine games that season, he was allowed to leave upon its conclusion. He in fact returned to the lan of his youth – Rochdale, who were as ever, in the basement division. After eleven games of 1998–99, he was injured again. For the first time in a long time, Stokes enjoyed consistent football in 1999–2000. He played 26 games, six of which were cup encounters. However at the age of 30 he dropped out of the Football League to play for Leek Town. He played five games for Leek in August and September of 2000.

Management career
A veteran of the non-leagues, Stokes became player-manager of Alsager Town in 2007. He quit the post in March 2008, and became part of the coaching set-up at Eccleshall.

In June 2009, he was made head coach at Rochdale Town. The club finished bottom of the North West Counties League in 2009–10.

Post-retirement
As of December 2011, Stokes works at Abraham Moss High School as a P.E teacher.

Career statistics
Source:

Honours
Port Vale
Football League Second Division second-place promotion: 1993–94
Anglo-Italian Cup runner-up: 1996

References

1970 births
Living people
Footballers from Birmingham, West Midlands
English footballers
Association football midfielders
Black British sportspeople
Rochdale Town F.C. players
Armitage 90 F.C. players
Redditch United F.C. players
Halesowen Town F.C. players
Port Vale F.C. players
Rochdale A.F.C. players
Leek Town F.C. players
Alsager Town F.C. players
English Football League players
Northern Premier League players
Association football player-managers
English football managers
Schoolteachers from Warwickshire